Albert Elyston Edgar Powell (22 June 1908 – 18 October 1940) was a Welsh professional footballer who played as a winger in the Football League for Swindon Town.

Personal life
Powell served as a gunner in the Royal Artillery during the Second World War and died on 18 October 1940. He was buried at Gwaelodybrithdir Cemetery.

Career statistics

References

1908 births
1940 deaths
People from Bargoed
Sportspeople from Caerphilly County Borough
Place of death missing
Association football wingers
Welsh footballers
English Football League players
Swindon Town F.C. players
Coventry City F.C. players
Hereford United F.C. players
Aberaman Athletic F.C. players
Royal Artillery soldiers
Welsh military personnel
British Army personnel killed in World War II